Viguera is a municipality in La Rioja, Spain. It includes the villages Castañares de las Cuevas, El Puente, and Panzares.

History
The earliest documentary evidence is in the Berber historian Ajbar Machmua, who told that Abd ar-Rahman I recovered La Rioja in 759, after it having been conquered by Alfonso I of Asturias in 755. He commented in particular that after taking Viguera Castle, Abd ar-Rahman I crossed all of La Rioja and penetrated Álava.

It was one of the fortifications that the Banu Qasi used to defend La Rioja from the Christians.

In the second half of the ninth century, Lubb ibn Musa, one of the sons of Musa ibn Musa al-Qasawi, reconstructed the fortress. Lubb died hunting deer and was buried in the location.

Upon Christian reconquest, it became the site of the Kingdom of Viguera (970-1005). At the end of this period, it became part of the Kingdom of Navarre, although later the area passed into the hand of the nobles of Cameros, as part of their feudal territory.

Demographics

Population centres
 Viguera
 Castañares de las Cuevas
 El Puente
 Panzares

Places of interest

 Parish Church of La Asunción: Constructed in the 16th century of masonry and ashlar, recently restored
 Hermitage of Nuestra Señora del Rosario: Based on an earlier hermitage from the 16th century, reformed in the 18th century
 Hermitage of San Marcos: Originally in the 17th century, recently restored by a group of women of the town who, without interest in the devotion of this hermitage or its festival, have restored it
 Hermitage of San Esteban
 Hermitage of Santa Lucía, in the village of Panzares, rebuilt in 1968 above a 16th-century edifice
 Parish Church of La Asunción: In Castañares de las Cuevas, from the 16th century
 Medieval bridges:
 Leaving Logroño near the border of Viguera, 11th century
 After Islallan

Local festivals
In honor of Saint Mark, April 25
Patrol festivals in honor of Saint James and Saint Ann. July 25 and 26

References

Municipalities in La Rioja (Spain)